The 2011 Men's African Volleyball Championship was held in Tangier, Morocco, from September 23 to September 29, 2011.

Teams

Group stage
The draw was held on 22 September.

Group A

|}

|}

Group B

|}

|}

Knockout stage

5–8th place bracket

Classification 5–8 places

|}

Seventh place match

|}

Fifth place match

|}

Championship bracket

Semifinals

|}

Bronze medal match

|}

Final

|}

Final standing

Awards
MVP:  Ahmed Abdelhay
Best Digger:  Anwer Taouerghi
Best Spiker:  Jean Ndaki
Best Blocker:  Sem Dolegombi
Best Server:  Ahmed Abdelhay
Best Setter:  Abdalla Ahmed
Best Libero:  Rafik Djoudi

References

2011 Men
Men's African Volleyball Championship
African Men's Volleyball Championship
Men's African Volleyball Championship
International volleyball competitions hosted by Kenya